Telemarken Lutheran Church is a historic church near Wallace, South Dakota. The church was added to the National Register in 1989.

The church is an example of the rural churches established by Norwegian immigrant homesteaders. It is a Gothic Revival structure. It was built in 1901 with a wood frame supported by a poured concrete foundation and is clad with clapboard siding. Adjacent to the church is a cemetery with gravestones dating back to 1892.

References

Lutheran churches in South Dakota
Churches on the National Register of Historic Places in South Dakota
Gothic Revival church buildings in South Dakota
Churches completed in 1901
Churches in Clark County, South Dakota
Norwegian-American culture in South Dakota
National Register of Historic Places in Clark County, South Dakota